Barney Marman (born 30 May 1978) is a Botswana former footballer who played as a midfielder. He played ten games for the Botswana national football team between 1997 and 2003.

External links

Association football midfielders
Botswana footballers
Botswana international footballers
1978 births
Living people
Mogoditshane Fighters players